Adgur Amiranovich Ardzinba (born 26 December 1981 in Gudauta) is an Abkhazian politician, formerly the Minister for Economy of Abkhazia from 2015 to 2020.

Minister for Economy of Abkhazia 
Ardzinba was appointed by President Raul Khajimba on 8 April 2015, succeeding Nikolai Achba. As Minister for Economy, he announced plans to launch an own Abkhaz cryptocurrency in a bid to avoid potential sanctions and attract international investment. “The advantage of this cryptocurrency market has to do with the fact that any citizen in the entire world can invest in our economy, not fearing sanctions or other awkward limitations placed on us by the international community,” he said to Apsnypress late 2017. One year later, rampant cryptocurrency mining threatened the shaky electrical network in the  republic, forcing officials to call for putting regulatory shackles on the money-making scheme in order to stave off power supply interruptions during the winter 2018/2019. Ardzinba however, stuck to the cryptocurrency plans and said to Meduza that "given the limitations associated with the status of the republic, … we always seek nonconventional solutions to reach an acceptable level of economic development.” Apparently, Ardzinba had sought support for his cryptocurrency plans by the Russian government.

In 2020, he competed in the 2020 Abkhazian presidential election for the Forum for the National Unity of Abkhazia. He lost against Aslan Bzhania and only received 36.9% of the votes. One month later, Bzhania as the new president dismissed Ardzinba.

After the success of Bzhania, Ardzinba criticized his government and implied that worsened Abkhazia–Russia relations were the reason for financial problems of Abkhazia.

References

1981 births
Living people
Ministers for Economy of Abkhazia
People from Gudauta
Candidates in the 2020 Abkhazian presidential election